Fontenay-lès-Briis (literally Fontenay near Briis) is a commune in the Essonne department in Île-de-France in northern France.

Inhabitants of Fontenay-lès-Briis are known as Fontenois.

History
The village of Fontenay-lès-Briis is mentioned in the charter of Clotilde, dated to 10 March 673, founding a nunnery at Bruyères-le-Châtel.

Geography

Climate

Fontenay-lès-Briis has a oceanic climate (Köppen climate classification Cfb).

See also
Communes of the Essonne department

References

External links
Official website 
Mayors of Essonne Association 

Communes of Essonne